McCoy Park is a park in the Portsmouth neighborhood of Portland, Oregon, United States. Named for the Oregon Senator Bill McCoy and his wife Gladys, the park is located at the center of New Columbia, a large housing development in Portsmouth.

Description and history
The park was acquired in 2005 and features paved paths and picnic tables, a playground, and a basketball court.

Shootings took place at or near McCoy Park in 2011, 2014, and 2016, two of them fatal.

See also
 List of parks in Portland, Oregon

References

External links
 

2005 establishments in Oregon
Parks in Portland, Oregon
Portsmouth, Portland, Oregon
Protected areas established in 2005